Skream! is the self-titled, debut album by dubstep producer Skream. It was released in 2006 on the Tempa label. The album is considered to be an important stepping stone for dubstep. BBC Music described it as having "accelerated dubstep’s transformation from hyped underground scene to [a] sort of influential [genre]", as it fuzes more "old-school rave" sounds with more accessible "pop" sounds. The album predates the highly popular and influential dubstep works by producers such as Skrillex, sometimes disparagingly referred to as "brostep". It essentially serves as an accessible entry into "classic dubstep".

Track listing 
 "Tortured Soul" 4:18
 "Midnight Request Line" 3:56
 "Blue Eyez" 4:39
 "Auto-Dub" 2:50
 "Check It" (featuring Warrior Queen) 4:12
 "Stagger" 4:41
 "Dutch Flowerz" 4:21
 "Rutten" 6:32
 "Tapped" (featuring JME) 3:38
 "Kut-Off" 4:33
 "Summer Dreams" 7:58
 "Colourful" 5:13
 "Emotionally Mute" 4:35

Expanded Edition
 "Check-It (Instrumental)" 4:13
 "Midnight Request Line (Mala Remix)" 5:22

The album was also released on vinyl across three plates, with a different track listing.

Vinyl track listing 
A1 "Stagger"
B1 "Blue Eyez"
B2 "Tortured Soul"
C1 "Kut-Off"
D1 "Rutten"
D2 "Colourful"
E1 "Check-It" (Instrumental)
F1 "Dubbers Anonymous"
F2 "Midnight Request Line" (Digital Mystikz Remix)

References 

2006 debut albums
Skream albums